Buntingford Manor House is an 18th-century building in the town of Buntingford, in Hertfordshire, England.

Usage
The house, located on Market Hill in between The Crown Public House and Barclays Bank, was originally the home of the Lord of the Manor.
It is used as the Buntingford Heritage Centre, where information on the history of the town can be found.

References

External links
 http://www.buntingford.com/heritage-centre/

Country houses in Hertfordshire
Tourist attractions in Hertfordshire
Grade II listed buildings in Hertfordshire
Buntingford